B.A. Schiff & Associates was a roller coaster manufacturing firm based in Miami, Florida, United States. Founded by its namesake, Ben Schiff, the company produced family style roller coasters including a variety of kiddie roller coasters and Wild Mouse roller coasters. The company operated from approximately 1948 into the early 1970s.

List of roller coasters

As of 2020, B.A. Schiff & Associates has built 96 roller coasters around the world.

References

Amusement ride manufacturers
Roller coaster designers
Roller coaster manufacturers
Manufacturing companies based in Miami
Design companies established in 1948
Manufacturing companies established in 1948
Defunct manufacturing companies based in Florida